The CONMEBOL Sudamericana, named as Copa Sudamericana, is an annual international club football competition organized by CONMEBOL since 2002. It is the second-most prestigious club competition in South American football. CONCACAF clubs were invited between 2004 and 2008. The CONMEBOL Sudamericana began in 2002, replacing the separate competitions Copa Merconorte and Copa Mercosur (that had replaced Copa CONMEBOL) by a single competition. Since its introduction, the competition has been a pure elimination tournament with the number of rounds and teams varying from year to year.

The CONMEBOL Sudamericana is considered a merger of defunct tournaments such as the Copa CONMEBOL, Copa Mercosur and Copa Merconorte. The winner of the Copa Sudamericana becomes eligible to play in the Recopa Sudamericana. They gain entry onto the next edition of the Copa Libertadores, South America's premier club competition, and also contest the J.League Cup / Copa Sudamericana Championship.

The reigning champion of the competition is Ecuadorian club Independiente del Valle, who defeated Brazilian club São Paulo in the most recent final.

Argentine clubs have accumulated the most victories with nine while containing the largest number of different winning teams, with a total of seven clubs having won the title. The cup has been won by 17 different clubs. Argentine clubs Boca Juniors and Independiente as well as Brazilian club Athletico Paranaense and Ecuadorian club Independiente del Valle are the most successful clubs in the cup's history, having won the tournament twice, with Boca Juniors being the only one to achieve it back-to-back, in 2004 and 2005.

History

In 1992, the Copa CONMEBOL was an international football tournament created for South American clubs that did not qualify for the Copa Libertadores and Supercopa Sudamericana. This tournament was discontinued in 1999 and replaced by the Copa Merconorte and Copa Mercosur. These tournaments started in 1998 but were discontinued in 2001. A Pan-American club cup competition was intended, under the name of Copa Pan-Americana, but instead, the Copa Sudamericana was introduced in 2002 as a single-elimination tournament with the reigning Copa Mercosur champion, San Lorenzo.

Format
Until 2016 the tournament comprised 47 teams in a knockout format, with the Argentine and Brazilian teams getting byes to the second round and the defending champions entering the competition in the round of 16. Starting from the 2017 edition, the tournament implemented the following format changes:
The tournament was expanded from 47 to 54 teams.
A total of 44 teams would directly enter the Copa Sudamericana, while a total of 10 teams eliminated from the Copa Libertadores (two best teams eliminated in the third stage of qualifying and eight third-placed teams in the group stage) would be transferred to the Copa Sudamericana, entering the competition in the second stage.
The schedule of the tournament was extended to year-round so it would start in February and conclude in December.
As the Copa Libertadores and the Copa Sudamericana would be held concurrently, no team would be able to qualify for both tournaments in the same year (except those which were transferred from the Copa Libertadores to the Copa Sudamericana).
The Copa Sudamericana champions would no longer directly qualify for the next edition as they would now directly qualify for the group stage of the Copa Libertadores (although they would still be able to defend their title if they finished third in the group stage).
Brazil would be allocated six berths, decreased from eight.
All teams directly entering the Copa Sudamericana would enter the first stage.

The competition's format was further altered ahead of the 2021 edition, in which a group stage was introduced replacing the second stage and the six qualifiers from Argentina and Brazil were given byes to that stage, with the teams from the remaining associations being drawn against a team from their same country in the first stage, ensuring that at least two teams from each association would take part in the group stage. The competition was further expanded to include all four teams eliminated from the Copa Libertadores third stage, which would also enter the group stage, while the eight third-placed teams from the Copa Libertadores group stage would enter the round of 16. Two years later, the format for the first stage of the tournament was changed from double-legged ties to single-match ones and a knockout round prior to the round of 16 was introduced, in which the eight teams transferred from the Copa Libertadores group stage would play against the Copa Sudamericana group runners-up with the winners joining the group winners in the following stage of the competition.

Trophy 

The tournament shares its name with the trophy, also called the Copa Sudamericana or simply la Sudamericana, which is awarded to the Copa Sudamericana winner.

La Otra Mitad de La Gloria 
La Otra Mitad de La Gloria (The other half of glory) is a promotional Spanish phrase used in the context of winning or attempting on winning the Copa Sudamericana. It is a term widely used by Spanish-speaking media. The tournament itself has become highly regarded among its participants since its inception. In 2004, Cienciano's conquest of the trophy ignited a party across Peru. The Mexican football federation regards Pachuca's victory in 2006 as the most important title won by any Mexican club.

Sponsorship 
Like the Copa Libertadores, the Copa Sudamericana was sponsored by a group of multinational corporations. Like the premier South American club football tournament forementioned, the competition used a single, main sponsor. The first major sponsor was Nissan Motors, who signed an 8-year contract with CONMEBOL in 2003. 

However, the competition has had many secondary sponsors that invest in the tournament as well. Many of these sponsors are nationally based but have expanded to other nations. Nike supplies the official match ball, as they do for all other CONMEBOL competitions. Embratel, a brand of Telmex, is the only telecommunications sponsor of the tournament. Individual clubs may wear jerseys with advertising, even if such sponsors conflict with those of the Copa Sudamericana.

Prize money 
For the 2023 Copa Sudamericana, clubs playing their first stage match at home receive US$225,000, while teams that play their first stage match away receive US$250,000. Clubs qualifying for the group stage are awarded US$900,000, earning US$100,000 per match won in that stage. Those amounts are derived from television rights and stadium advertising. In addition to those amounts, CONMEBOL will pay US$500,000 to the clubs reaching the knockout round play-offs, US$550,000 to those advancing to the round of 16, US$600,000 for reaching the quarter-finals, US$800,000 for reaching the semi-finals, US$2,000,000 to the runners-up and US$5,000,000 to the winners.

Media coverage 
Starting from 2019 season, DirecTV (Latin America, exclude Brazil) and DAZN (Brazil) broadcast the Copa and Recopa Sudamericana coverage until 2022 from the previous broadcaster, Fox Sports (Latin America) and the CONMEBOL Libertadores-Sudamericana broadcast package are separate. RedeTV! (Brazil) will also broadcast the tournament.

Records and statistics 

Claudio Morel Rodríguez is the only player to have won three Copa Sudamericana winners' medals.

As of the end of the 2014 tournament, LDU Quito and São Paulo have played most games in the tournament (50).

Winners

Performances by nation

Source:

References

External links 

 

 Copa Sudamericana results at RSSSF
 Copa Sudamericana at worldfootball.net 

 
CONMEBOL club competitions
Multi-national professional sports leagues